Kimball's Store, also known as Kimball Building, was a historic retail establishment at 500 and 504 West 5th Avenue in downtown Anchorage, Alaska.  The dry goods store operated at the same site from 1915 to 2002, and its two-story wood-frame building is the only commercial building to survive at its original location from the period of Anchorage's founding.  The store was established by Irving L. Kimball, who had been trading in Arctic communities of Alaska since 1897, and was operated afterward by his daughter until her death in 2002.

The building was listed on the National Register of Historic Places in 1986.

See also
 National Register of Historic Places listings in Anchorage, Alaska

References

1915 establishments in Alaska
Buildings and structures in Anchorage, Alaska
Commercial buildings completed in 1915
Commercial buildings on the National Register of Historic Places in Alaska
Retail buildings in Alaska
Buildings and structures on the National Register of Historic Places in Anchorage, Alaska